Walter Menzies Campbell, Baron Campbell of Pittenweem,  (born 22 May 1941), often known as Ming Campbell, is a British Liberal Democrat politician, advocate and former athlete.  He was the Member of Parliament (MP) for North East Fife from 1987 to 2015 and was the Leader of the Liberal Democrats from 2 March 2006 until 15 October 2007.

Campbell held the British record for the 100 metre sprint from 1967 to 1974, having run the distance in 10.2 seconds.  He captained the Great Britain athletics team in 1965–66. He is currently the Chancellor of the University of St Andrews. He was nominated for a life peerage in the 2015 Dissolution Honours.

Education and early career
Born in Glasgow, Campbell was educated at Hillhead High School and the University of Glasgow, graduating with a Scottish Master of Arts (MA) in 1962 and a Bachelor of Laws (LLB) in 1965. He was elected President of the Glasgow University Liberal Club in 1962, and of the Glasgow University Union for 1964–65.

Campbell married Elspeth, Lady Grant-Suttie, daughter of Major General Roy Urquhart and former wife of Sir Philip Grant-Suttie, 8th Baronet, in June 1970. The couple have no children, but Lady Campbell has a son from her first marriage.

Athletics career

He was a sprinter at university and he broke Olympic gold medalist Wyndham Halswelle's 53-year-old Scottish 300 yards record in 1961. Campbell competed for the Great Britain team in the 200 metres and 4×100 metres relay at the 1964 Olympic Games in Tokyo, and captained the Scotland team at the 1966 British Empire and Commonwealth Games in Kingston, Jamaica. He also captained the Great Britain athletics team in 1965 and 1966, and held the British 100 metres record from 1967 to 1974. At one time he was known as "the fastest white man on the planet", running the 100m in 10.2 seconds twice during 1967. In his first 10.2-second race he beat O. J. Simpson, who was then an aspiring athlete.

Member of Parliament

Liberal Democrats frontbenches
As foreign affairs spokesperson, Campbell was prominent in the Liberal Democrat opposition to the 2003 Iraq War, arguing that the British government should publish the Attorney General's secret advice on the war's legality and criticising Tony Blair's support for President George W. Bush. In 2004, Campbell set out his view of the Anglo-American relationship in the context of an unjust war: "For more than 60 years we have been engaged in an intimate and rewarding relationship with the United States. We must not allow our foreign policy to be defined by that relationship. We have to recognize that the World's most powerful English-speaking nation will always be a powerful influence upon us.  Given what we share, it could hardly be otherwise. But a relationship with the United States based on the flawed principle, "my ally right or wrong" is not only profoundly illiberal but will be unsustainable as well."

Leader of the Liberal Democrats
On 7 January 2006, Campbell became interim leader following Kennedy's resignation, before winning the subsequent leadership contest. On 2 March 2006, Campbell was declared leader after winning the leadership election under the alternative vote method. The first-round votes placed him in the lead, at 23,264 to Huhne's 16,691 and Simon Hughes's 12,081. Hughes was accordingly eliminated, and his second-preference votes were split between the two remaining candidates. The final result was Campbell at 29,697 and Chris Huhne at 21,628 on a 72% membership turnout.

Campbell promoted many younger MPs to his frontbench team including former MEP Nick Clegg as Home Affairs spokesperson and 26-year-old Jo Swinson as Scotland spokesperson.

Questions over leadership
Campbell's early performances at the weekly Prime Minister's Questions were criticised, leading him to declare himself "perfectly confident" that he could fulfil the role of party leader. Campbell regained some ground with the controversy over the US practice of "extraordinary rendition", the case of the NatWest Three, and the conflict in Lebanon.

According to polls published in July 2006, twice as many voters preferred Charles Kennedy as leader over Campbell, which led to further criticism of Campbell's leadership. However, Kennedy called rumours that he was considering challenging for the leadership as "fanciful".

The University of St Andrews awarded an honorary doctorate of law to former President Mohammad Khatami of Iran, which sparked some criticism, although as Chancellor he is only the titular head and not involved in such decisions. Khatami was elected as President of Iran in 1997 and 2001, both occasions on platforms of social and political reform and a "Dialogue Among Civilizations" that put Khatami significantly at odds with his conservative successor, Mahmoud Ahmadinejad.

Shortly before Gordon Brown took over as Prime Minister in June 2007, Campbell was invited to a meeting with the then Chancellor of the Exchequer. Brown surprised Campbell by requesting that two Liberal Democrats (Lord Ashdown and Lady Neuberger) join his cabinet. After taking 24 hours to consult and consider, Campbell rejected the offer as unworkable, given the gulf between the parties on issues of foreign policy and civil liberties. Labour leaked news of the meeting to the media and went behind Campbell to offer the job of Secretary of State for Northern Ireland to Ashdown anyway; he turned it down.

After intense speculation in late 2007, Gordon Brown announced there would be no general election in 2007. Following this announcement, Campbell's leadership again came under question, with some in the party feeling that now the heat was off the time was ripe to get a younger leader potentially more capable of connecting with voters. On 15 October, Campbell's deputy Vince Cable conceded on BBC Radio 4's The World at One programme that Campbell's position was "certainly under discussion", adding "I don't think it's under threat", but on the same programme party stalwart Sir Chris Clarke advised Campbell to "go with dignity and go back to being foreign affairs spokesman, where the world listens to you." Later the same day came an announcement by the party that Campbell would step down as leader.

Resignation of leadership
Campbell resigned as leader of the Liberal Democrats on 15 October 2007. The announcement was made from the steps of Cowley Street by Party President Simon Hughes. Alongside him was deputy Leader Vince Cable; they praised Campbell's leadership and said the party owed him a debt of gratitude. In his letter of resignation, addressed to Hughes, Campbell stated, "It has become clear that following the Prime Minister's decision not to hold an election, questions about leadership are getting in the way of further progress by the party".

Cable became acting leader of the Liberal Democrats until a leadership election could be held. Campbell became the first elected leader of the Liberal Democrats who left the leadership without ever leading the party to a general election. Following the resignation, a leadership contender, Nick Clegg, alleged that Campbell had been a victim of ageism throughout his term as party leader, saying he had been treated "appallingly" and subject to "barely disguised ageism".

Concerns about ageism directed at Campbell from the media had also been raised by the charity Age Concern in September 2006. Gordon Lishman, the director of the charity, said "the recent media coverage poking fun at Sir Menzies has brought to light the age discrimination that is epidemic in the media and society". Attacking media coverage that seemed to focus on his age, Lishman added "clearly the media needs to update its attitudes and get with the times; people are living and working longer and age discrimination is out dated".

Expenses claims
Sir Menzies Campbell reportedly claimed around £10,000 over two years to redesign his flat in London, which included the purchasing of a king-sized bed, scatter cushions and a small flat screen television. It was also claimed that on occasions Campbell spent eight hundred pounds a month on food. Campbell said he believed that the claims were "within the spirit and letter of the rules" as the flat had not been renovated for 20 years.

Retirement from the House of Commons
On 9 October 2013, Campbell announced that he would stand down as a Member of Parliament at the 2015 general election. He said: "It is always a regret to begin the process of retiring from the House of Commons but I believe now is the time to start". Liberal Democrat Leader Nick Clegg paid tribute, saying Campbell "served this country and our party with unparalleled distinction".

There was speculation in 2013 that he would be offered a seat in the House of Lords – an opportunity in which, during an interview with Chat Politics, Campbell declared his interest. He became a life peer and a member of the House of Lords in October 2015. Campbell has stated that he believes the House of Lords should be "mainly elected" and will continue to promote that idea "within the house itself."

Political views
Campbell promoted policies to shift taxation away from goods such as employment and towards bads such as pollution through a revenue-neutral restructuring of the tax system that maintains the current tax burden whilst lifting two-million low-paid individuals out of income tax altogether.

Campbell's primary area of interest is acknowledged to be foreign policy. He strongly supports multilateral institutions such as the European Union and the United Nations but argues that the European Union must reform to become more democratic and the United Nations must develop new mechanisms for dealing with humanitarian crises.

He has been critical of what he claims as the "disproportionate military action" employed by the Israeli Defence Force in Gaza and in Lebanon, contending that Israel's tactics exacerbate existing tensions and lead to human rights abuses. Though a supporter of Anglo-American cooperation, Campbell has argued that the Bush-Blair relationship was one-sided and that the Labour government pursued it at the expense of Britain's standing in other international institutions, particularly the EU and UN.

Campbell had stressed the need for the Liberal Democrats to provide extra support for female, disabled and ethnic minority candidates seeking to contest winnable seats.

In July 2007, Campbell unveiled tax proposals that amounted to a large shift in the tax burden away from low-income and middle-income earners and onto higher-earners and pollution. This was to be implemented by cutting the basic rate of income tax from 20% to 16%, closing £13.5 billion of tax loopholes for high-earners and imposing larger green taxes on polluters. Campbell said of the proposals that "the unacceptable reality is that in Britain today the poorest pay a higher proportion of their income in tax than the super-rich" and that his aim was for "the rich and people with environmentally damaging lifestyles to pay a fairer share".

Campbell is a member of the Top Level Group of UK Parliamentarians for Multilateral Nuclear Disarmament and Non-proliferation, established in October 2009.

In August 2018, Campbell spoke at a People's Vote rally in Edinburgh. People's Vote was a campaign group calling for a public vote on the final Brexit deal between the UK and the European Union.

Honours
Campbell was appointed Commander of the Order of the British Empire (CBE) in the 1987 New Year Honours; he became a Privy Counsellor in the 1999 New Year Honours; and he was knighted in the 2004 New Year Honours for services to Parliament, having the honour conferred by the Prince of Wales on 27 May 2004.

He was appointed a Companion of Honour (CH) in the 2013 Birthday Honours for public and political service. He was nominated for a life peerage in the 2015 Dissolution Honours and created Baron Campbell of Pittenweem, of Pittenweem in the County of Fife, on 13 October 2015.

Campbell has honorary degrees from the University of Glasgow and the University of Strathclyde. He was the only person nominated to succeed Sir Kenneth Dover after he retired as Chancellor of the University of St Andrews on 1 January 2006, so took office immediately after nominations closed on 9 January 2006. He was installed as Chancellor on 22 April 2006, at which time he also received the honorary degree of Doctor of Laws.

In 2010 it was reported that Campbell had been considered for the post of High Commissioner to Australia; The Guardian claimed it had been stalled as it would trigger a by-election in Campbell's constituency.

References

External links

 
 Rt Hon Sir Menzies Campbell CBE QC MP Liberal Democrats profile
 Sir Menzies Campbell CBE QC MP Scottish Liberal Democrats profile
 
 
 
 
 

|-

|-

|-

|-

|-

|-

|-

1941 births
20th-century Scottish politicians
21st-century Scottish politicians
Alumni of the University of Glasgow
Athletes (track and field) at the 1964 Summer Olympics
Athletes (track and field) at the 1966 British Empire and Commonwealth Games
Universiade medalists in athletics (track and field)
British sportsperson-politicians
Chancellors of the University of St Andrews
Commanders of the Order of the British Empire
Commonwealth Games competitors for Scotland
Knights Bachelor
Leaders of the Liberal Democrats (UK)
Liberal Democrats (UK) life peers
Life peers created by Elizabeth II
Living people
Members of the Faculty of Advocates
Members of the Order of the Companions of Honour
Members of the Parliament of the United Kingdom for Fife constituencies
Members of the Privy Council of the United Kingdom
Olympic athletes of Great Britain
People educated at Hillhead High School
Politicians awarded knighthoods
Politicians from Glasgow
20th-century King's Counsel
Scottish Liberal Party MPs
Scottish Liberal Democrat MPs
Scottish male sprinters
Scottish Presbyterians
Scottish King's Counsel
Sportspeople from Glasgow
Stanford University alumni
UK MPs 1987–1992
UK MPs 1992–1997
UK MPs 1997–2001
UK MPs 2001–2005
UK MPs 2005–2010
UK MPs 2010–2015
Universiade gold medalists for Great Britain
Medalists at the 1961 Summer Universiade
Medalists at the 1963 Summer Universiade
Medalists at the 1965 Summer Universiade
Medalists at the 1967 Summer Universiade
Universiade silver medalists for Great Britain
Universiade bronze medalists for Great Britain